This article contains a list of fossil-bearing stratigraphic units in the state of Michigan, U.S.

Sites

See also

 Paleontology in Michigan

References

 

Michigan
Stratigraphic units
Stratigraphy of Michigan
Michigan geography-related lists
United States geology-related lists